Roberto Espinosa Cabriales (born 8 October 1959) is a Cuban footballer. He competed in the men's tournament at the 1980 Summer Olympics.

References

External links
 

1959 births
Living people
Cuban footballers
Cuba international footballers
Association football midfielders
FC Cienfuegos players
Olympic footballers of Cuba
Footballers at the 1980 Summer Olympics
People from Cienfuegos
20th-century Cuban people